Vittoria Panizzon is an Italian equestrian and three-time Olympian. She has represented Italy at Pony, Junior, Young rider and Senior levels and has been a member of the national senior squad at major championships since 2005.

At the 2012 Summer Olympics she competed in the Individual eventing, while at the 2008 Olympics, she competed in both the individual and team events.

References

1983 births
Living people
Equestrians at the 2008 Summer Olympics
Equestrians at the 2012 Summer Olympics
Equestrians at the 2020 Summer Olympics
Equestrians of Centro Sportivo Aeronautica Militare
Italian female equestrians
Olympic equestrians of Italy
Place of birth missing (living people)